Mount Moriah Presbyterian Church, also known as First Presbyterian Church, is a historic Presbyterian church located at Church and S. Main Sts., NW corner, Town of Moriah in Port Henry, Essex County, New York.  It was built in 1888 and is a distinguished example of Richardsonian Romanesque architecture.  It is rectangular in plan and constructed of dark sandstone.  It features an unusual two story, hipped roof, combination porte cochere and bell tower.

It was listed on the National Register of Historic Places in 1995.

References

Presbyterian churches in New York (state)
Churches on the National Register of Historic Places in New York (state)
Churches completed in 1888
19th-century Presbyterian church buildings in the United States
Churches in Essex County, New York
Romanesque Revival church buildings in New York (state)
National Register of Historic Places in Essex County, New York